

The Hermitage (officially The Hermitage pleasure ground) is a National Trust for Scotland-protected site in Dunkeld, Perth and Kinross. Located just to the west of the A9, it sits on the banks of the River Braan in Craigvinean Forest. It was created by John Murray, the third Duke of Atholl, who lived in nearby Dunkeld House (demolished in the early 19th century), in the 18th century to honour the blind bard Ossian. It is home to the Georgian follies Ossian's Hall of Mirrors and Ossian's Cave. The hermit's cave was built around 1760 for the third Earl of Breadalbane, who unsuccessfully advertised for a permanent eremite. The guide in 1869, Donald Anderson, dressed up with a long beard of lichens and clothes of animal skins.

Also in its grounds are several Douglas-fir trees — one of which was the first tree in Britain to reach  in height. The tree was blown over due to high winds in the early hours of 13 January 2017. Thought to have been planted in the 1750s, it was, therefore, around 267 years old at the time it fell.

Visitors to the site can undertake various walks. The most popular walk is the -long journey to Ossian's Hall. Wheelchairs are accommodated via a pass-for-all route. There is also a link to a thirty-mile network of footpaths beyond The Hermitage to various parts of Dunkeld. These paths date back to the 18th century.

Originally, the popular riverside path purposely deviated away from the river at about a half-mile from the car park. This was to build up the visitors' anticipation for the waterfall (the Black Linn Falls) that is to be found a short distance ahead. Another path, running parallel to the riverside path, is wider, the purpose for which, it is believed, was to accommodate horse and carriages. Hermitage Bridge, dating from 1770, is located nearby. Standing next to it, and appearing to be growing out of it, is a Cedar of Lebanon, which is believed to be the oldest tree at The Hermitage.

Hermitage Bridge

Views of Ossian's Cave and Craigvinean Forest

Ossian's Hall

References

External links

OutdoorScotland.co.uk
ScottishTowns.co.uk
Walking in Perthshire Big Tree Country - Perth and Kinross Countryside Trust

National Trust for Scotland properties
Forests and woodlands of Scotland
Inventory of Gardens and Designed Landscapes
Protected areas of Perth and Kinross